Whitehorse is a Canadian folk rock band, composed of husband-and-wife duo Luke Doucet and Melissa McClelland. Based in Hamilton, Ontario, Doucet and McClelland were both established singer-songwriters before opting to put their solo careers on hold to work together as Whitehorse.

Bio
Doucet and McClelland toured in each other's bands for years before forming Whitehorse in 2010. They have since released three albums and two EPs on Six Shooter Records.

In July 2013, their second album The Fate of the World Depends on This Kiss was shortlisted for the 2013 Polaris Music Prize. That year, they also played their first show at Massey Hall, one of Canada's most storied music venues; to mark the occasion, they released The Road to Massey Hall, an EP comprising cover versions of songs written and performed by other artists who had previously performed there.

In 2014, they released Éphémère sans repère, an EP of French language versions of several of their songs. Lyric translations for the EP were provided by Pierre Marchand.

Their third full-length album, Leave No Bridge Unburned, was released on February 17, 2015 and won the Juno Award for Adult Alternative Album of the Year at the Juno Awards of 2016.

Panther in the Dollhouse is their fourth studio album. The album was released via Six Shooter Records on July 7, 2017.

Live performance
Whitehorse performs live as a duo. While both Doucet and McClelland play guitar as their primary instruments as singer-songwriters, as Whitehorse each performs on a number of instruments.

The band makes extensive use of live looping; most commonly by opening many songs by creating layered drum and percussion loops to serve as a drum track. They also loop instrumental portions and vocal phrases in some songs.

Doucet generally plays the drum kit parts with McClelland adding other percussion elements. McClelland plays bass guitar and keyboards along with acoustic (and occasionally electric) guitar. Other than drums, Doucet generally plays electric (or acoustic outfitted to sound as an electric) guitar, with occasional keyboards. The duo also often uses several different vocal mics to achieve different sounds.

Discography

Studio albums 
Whitehorse (2011)
The Fate of the World Depends on This Kiss (2012)
Leave No Bridge Unburned (2015)
Panther in the Dollhouse (2017)
A Whitehorse Winter Classic (2018)
Modern Love (2021)
Strike Me Down (2021)
I'm Not Crying, You're Crying (2023)

EPs 
The Road to Massey Hall (2013)
Éphémère sans repère (2014)
The Northern South, Vol. 1 (2016)
The Northern South, Vol. 2 (2019)

Awards and nominations

References

External links

Six Shooter Records

Canadian folk rock groups
Musical groups from Hamilton, Ontario
Six Shooter Records artists
Married couples
Canadian musical duos
Musical groups established in 2011
2011 establishments in Ontario
Juno Award for Adult Alternative Album of the Year winners
Folk rock duos
Male–female musical duos